Ishmael Marika (born 1991) is a Yolngu (also written Yolŋu) musician, filmmaker, director and producer. His installations have been exhibited in many of Australia's most important museums, including the Museum of Contemporary Art in Sydney and the Art Gallery of South Australia in Adelaide. He is currently the Creative Director for the pre-eminent Indigenous media unit in Australia, the Mulka Project, based at Buku-Larrnggay Mulka Art Centre at Yirrkala in Northeast Arnhem Land. The Mulka Project seeks to preserve and disseminate the sacred languages and cultural practices of the Yolngu people by collecting and archiving photographs, audio and video.

Life 
Ishmael was born in Nhulunbuy, Australia, to mother Yalmakany Marawili, and father Gary Waninya (also written Wanyubi) Marika. His mother is a Yirralka Ranger and exhibited artist, and sister to Djambawa Marawili. His father is a prominent artist who has an Order of Australia for services to Indignous Health. His mother's side of the family belongs to the Madarrpa clan and his father's side belongs to the Rirratjingu clan. His maternal grandmother is Dhudu Djapu. His paternal grandfather's side is Dhalwangu. Ishmael's father is also an elder of the Rirratjingu clan and his grandfather, Milirrpum, represented his people as the lead plaintiff in the first Land Rights case —Milirrpum v Nabalco Pty Ltd, also known as the Gove Land Rights Case, in 1971.   

Marika  spent his youth in Yilpara, a school in the East Arnhem Region, Australia. He attended Nhulubuy Primary School before moving to Melbourne, Australia to complete years 8 and 9. He then attended a school in Darwin, the capital of Australia's Northern Territory, finishing years 10 to 12. In 2009, he returned to Yirrkala in the East Arnhem Shire in the Northern Arnhem Territory of Australia. Here he spent 6 months working as ranger before beginning his work with the Mulka Project in 2010, where he currently is Creative Director.

Career 
Ishmael Marika grew up with traditional music and began singing at the age of 10. He has continued to write songs that tell the traditional stories of his people about the creation of the world, the relationship between man and his natural environment, behaviours and etiquette of his people, and more. In 2016, Marika earned critical acclaim for his song “Two Sisters Journey.”  In addition to songwriting, Ishmael has worked on numerous cultural productions for the Yolngu people, with the permission of the elders, including documentations of various ceremonial traditions such as the dhapi and baparru ceremonies. His first and most widely-known documentary, is titled Wanga Watangumirri Dharuk (2010), about Yolngu land rights—a subject with familial importance to him. This documentary has appeared at several music festivals, and was privately screened for East Timor former President José Ramos-Horta. In 2014, he released a second film, Galka, a drama film about Yolŋu sorcery. Galka appeared at the Garma Festival of Traditional Cultures in 2014, where it received a standing ovation. Since this, Marika has produced a number of other films including Gapu Ga Gunda: The Art of Nongirrngga Marawili (2015), and a 5 episode installment titled Wunya’Gali (The Other Side) in 2017, commissioned by Transport for NSW.

Awards & Nominations 
Telstra Youth of the Year at the National Aboriginal & Torres Strait Islander Awards (NATSIA) in 2016.

NT Traditional Song of the Year at the National Indigenous Music Awards (NIMA) with a recording of "Two Sisters Journey."

Further reading 
 Wanambi, Wukun, Marika, Ishmael, "The mulka project," Artlink, v.36, no.2, Jun 2016, p. 82-84 (ISSN: 0727-1239), Jun 2016. Journal Article.
 "In a winning painting, the stolen generations," The Age (Melbourne, Australia), 2016 August 6, p. 16 (ISSN: 0312-6307), Newspaper article.

References 

Living people
1991 births
Australian musicians
Australian documentary filmmakers